Celine Marie Knudtzon Brun-Lie (born 18 March 1988) is a Norwegian former cross-country skier.

She won a bronze medal at the 2006 Junior World Ski Championships, recorded a fourth place at the 2007 Junior World Ski Championships and won a gold medal in relay at the 2008 Junior World Ski Championships. She made her World Cup debut in March 2007 in Stockholm, with a twentieth place. She recorded her first top-ten result in December 2007, with a tenth place in Rybinsk, and finished on the podium for the first time in December 2008, when she finished second in the sprint race in Davos. She also competed at the FIS Nordic World Ski Championships 2009, recording a twelfth place in the sprint.

At the 2010 Winter Olympics in Vancouver she reached the finals of both her events, coming sixth in the Individual Sprint and fifth (with Astrid Jacobsen) in the Team Sprint.

She represents the sports club Njård IL, and lives in Trondheim. She is a student at the Norwegian University of Science and Technology. She has three siblings and speaks Norwegian, English, and French.

In February 2015, Brun-Lie announced that she was retiring from top-level skiing after the 2015 season, aiming to complete her civil engineer studies at the Norwegian University of Science and Technology.

Cross-country skiing results
All results are sourced from the International Ski Federation (FIS).

Olympic Games

World Championships

World Cup

Season standings

Individual podiums

8 podiums – (5 , 3 )

Team podiums

 5 podiums – (5 )

References

Cross-country skiers at the 2010 Winter Olympics
Living people
Norwegian female cross-country skiers
Olympic cross-country skiers of Norway
Skiers from Oslo
1988 births